For village in same West Godavari district, Kukkunoor Mandal, see Madhavaram, Kukkunoor. Other uses, see Madhavaram (disambiguation)

Madhavaram is a village in West Godavari District, Andhra Pradesh, India. It is located approximately 12 km from Tadepalligudem, its mandal town. People from surrounding villages call this village as Military Madhavaram because, at least one person from every family in this village has worked or working in military. Around 1200 members from this village participated in first and second world wars. Around 91 soldiers died in these wars. Joining the military is an ambition for every youth in this village. One can find the ruins of that fort in Arugolanu.

Etymology  
Madhavaram Village is named after the Gajapathi King Pusapati Madhava Verma Brahma.

History 
Formation of this village is dated around 17th century. Then king Pusapati Madhava Verma Brahma of Gajapathi dynasty ruling the Deccan and Orissa regions built a fort in Arugolanu village about 6 KM from Madhavaram to protect his kingdom from enemies. He deployed soldiers from northern Andhra to this fort and provided them with Agricultural land and housing sites. Those soldiers formed the village of Madhavaram. One can find the ruins of that fort in Arugolanu even today. From then people of this village used to join in military. Generation after generation their aim is to serve the nation and protect it from enemies. During British Raj, around 1200 soldiers participated in WWI and WWII representing India.

Demographics 
As of the 2011 Census of India, Madhavaram had a population of 6509. The total population constitute, 3212 males and 3297 females with a sex ratio of 1026 females per 1000 males. 653 children are in the age group of 0–6 years, with sex ratio of 1093. The average literacy rate stands at 70.70%.

Economy  
Agriculture is another important employment in this village. Paddy and Sugarcane are important crops.

Culture 
All South Indian festivals are celebrated in Madhavaram. Particularly Polleramma Jathara is celebrated with much religious fervour. People come to Poleramma Jathara from surrounding villages and also from neighbouring state of Karnataka.
 

Temples

A temple for Poleramma, Sri Shiva temple, Sri Venkateswara temple, Sri Kumaraswamy temple, a Vaishanava temple exist in Madhavaram. Poleramma temple of Madhavaram is famous among the near by villages.

Education  
Madhavaram has a Government primary school, a ZP High school, a Government Junior college. There is a private school in Madhavaram.

Transport 
APSRTC runs buses from Tadepalligudem to Madhavaram. Nearest railway station is also in Tadepalligudem.

References 

Villages in West Godavari district